Madelynn Ann Bernau (born June 1, 1998, in Racine, Wisconsin) is an American sport shooter. Bernau and Brian Burrows won the bronze medal in the mixed trap team event at the 2020 Summer Olympics held in Tokyo, Japan.

References

Living people
1998 births
American female sport shooters
Trap and double trap shooters
Sportspeople from Racine, Wisconsin
Olympic shooters of the United States
Shooters at the 2020 Summer Olympics
Medalists at the 2020 Summer Olympics
Olympic bronze medalists for the United States in shooting
21st-century American women
20th-century American women